Radoslav Samardžić (born 17 October 1970) is a Serbian former professional footballer who played as a forward.

Club career
Between 1990 and 1995, Samardžić played five seasons for Vojvodina, scoring 44 league goals in 124 appearances. He subsequently went abroad and spent two seasons with Dutch club Volendam. In 1997, Samardžić was transferred to Heerenveen.

In August 1999, Samardžić signed a four-year deal with Feyenoord. He was loaned to RKC Waalwijk in February 2001. In February 2002, Samardžić terminated his contract with Feyenoord by mutual agreement.

International career
At international level, Samardžić was capped once for FR Yugoslavia in 1995.

References

External links
 
 
 

1970 births
Living people
Yugoslav footballers
Serbia and Montenegro footballers
Serbian footballers
Association football forwards
Serbia and Montenegro international footballers
FK Vojvodina players
FC Volendam players
SC Heerenveen players
Feyenoord players
RKC Waalwijk players
Yugoslav First League players
First League of Serbia and Montenegro players
Eredivisie players
Serbia and Montenegro expatriate footballers
Expatriate footballers in the Netherlands
Serbia and Montenegro expatriate sportspeople in the Netherlands